Clanculus (Paraclanculus) peccatus is a species of medium-sized sea snail, a marine gastropod mollusc in the family Trochidae, the top snails.

Description
The height of the shell attains 12 mm, its diameter 12 mm.

Distribution
This marine species is endemic to New Zealand, found under rocks at about 15–20 m off Great Barrier Island.

References

 Powell A. W. B., New Zealand Mollusca, William Collins Publishers Ltd, Auckland, New Zealand 1979 
 Spencer, H.G.; Marshall, B.A.; Maxwell, P.A.; Grant-Mackie, J.A.; Stilwell, J.D.; Willan, R.C.; Campbell, H.J.; Crampton, J.S.; Henderson, R.A.; Bradshaw, M.A.; Waterhouse, J.B.; Pojeta, J. Jr (2009). Phylum Mollusca: chitons, clams, tusk shells, snails, squids, and kin, in: Gordon, D.P. (Ed.) (2009). New Zealand inventory of biodiversity: 1. Kingdom Animalia: Radiata, Lophotrochozoa, Deuterostomia. pp. 161–254

External links
 

peccatus
Gastropods of New Zealand
Gastropods described in 1927
Taxa named by Harold John Finlay